Brandon Travares Wallace (born March 14, 1985) is an American professional basketball player.

High school
Born in Statesboro, Georgia, Wallace spent his high school years at Silver Bluff, where he averaged 21.9 points, 15.7 rebounds, 4.5 assists, and 4.3 blocks per game during his senior season. He led his team to a 24-7 record that year, culminating in an exciting state championship game, where he hit the game-winning shot at the final second. It was the first state title in Silver Bluff history. Wallace was rewarded with Player of the Year Honors by the Augusta Chronicle and also made the McDonald's All-American team. Other high school honors bestowed upon Wallace include the Region Five Class AA Player of the Year (2001 and 2002) and Best Defensive Player. Wallace was recruited by Maryland, Auburn, and the University of South Carolina. He chose the latter.

Prep/High School Awards & Honors
South Carolina Gatorade Player of the Year - 2003
South Carolina Mr. Basketball - 2003

College career
At the University of South Carolina, Wallace steadily improved his game. Freshman year, he merely averaged 3.7 ppg, 3.3 rpg, 1.0 bpg and 0.6 spg. Sophomore year, he averaged 5.7 ppg, 4.5 rpg, 0.9 apg, 1.0 spg, and 1.7 bpg. He led the team in blocks (55) and slam dunks (30.) Junior year, he averaged 7.6 ppg, 6.1 rpg, 2.3 apg, 1.9 bpg and 0.8 spg. As a senior year, he posted a stat line of 9.9 ppg, 9.4 rpg, 1.9 apg, 1.3 spg and 2.9 bpg. Wallace set the school record for blocked shots (249), good for ninth all-time in the SEC. He also ranks fifth in SEC history in blocks per game and sixth in rebounds.

College statistics

|-
| style="text-align:left;"| 2003-04
| style="text-align:left;"| South Carolina
| 34 ||4  ||13.4  || .397 || .263 || .583|| 3.32 ||0.79  || 0.56 || 1.03|| 3.68
|-
| style="text-align:left;"| 2004-05
| style="text-align:left;"| South Carolina
| 33 ||21  ||23.3  || .433 || .176 || .600|| 4.52||0.94  || 1.00 || 1.67 || 5.67
|-
| style="text-align:left;"| 2005-06
| style="text-align:left;"| South Carolina
| 38 ||35  ||30.2  || .500 || .239 || .556||5.89  ||2.29  || 0.79 || 1.79 || 7.63
|-
| style="text-align:left;"| 2006-07
| style="text-align:left;"| South Carolina
| 30 ||30  ||36.5  || .470 || .220 || .527|| 9.40 ||1.93  || 1.27 || 2.73 || 9.90
|-
|- class="sortbottom"
! style="text-align:center;" colspan=2|  Career 

!135 ||90 || 25.7 ||.460  || .223 ||.558  || 5.69 ||1.50  || 0.89 ||1.78  || 6.66
|-

Professional career
Despite a successful four year collegiate career, Wallace was not selected in the 2007 NBA draft. Nevertheless, he was invited to play for the Boston Celtics Las Vegas Summer League team. After just one Summer League game, the Boston Celtics signed the former high school standout to a 2-year partially guaranteed contract. Wallace played small forward for the Celtics, and earned a roster spot on the 2007–08 Celtics roster after competing with Dahntay Jones and Jackie Manuel who were both waived. On December 18, 2007, however, he was waived by the Celtics before appearing in a game.  He was selected in the second round of the NBA D League draft by the Bakersfield Jam.

European career
On August 4, 2008, it was reported that Wallace had signed with a Turkish team.

After being released, Brandon continued the season in Poland (Kwidzyn) averaging 7.8 ppg and 5.6 rpg. Brandon was also selected to the All-Star team.

On October 23, 2009, Brandon Wallace signed with Israeli state cup holder (and 2008 champion) Hapoel Holon.

Personal life
Wallace has two sons, one born in November 2007 and the other born July 2011

Career statistics

NBA Summer League Stats

|-
| style="text-align:left;"| 2008-09
| style="text-align:left;"| CHA
| 5 ||2  ||13.2  || .350 || 1.000 || 1.000|| 1.80 ||0.80  || 0.20 || 0.20|| 3.60
|-
| style="text-align:left;"| 2009-10
| style="text-align:left;"| WAS
| 4 ||1  ||12.7  || .500 || .000 || .400|| 1.75||0.25  || 0.50 || 0.00 || 3.50
|-

|-
|- class="sortbottom"
! style="text-align:center;" colspan=2|  Career 

!9 ||3 || 13.0 ||.406  || .500 ||.625  || 1.78 ||0.56  || 0.33 ||0.11  || 3.56
|-

Regular season 

|-
| align="left" | 2007-08
| align="left" | SBL/UTA/IWA
|31 ||18 || 30.2 ||.447  || .167 ||.627  || 6.61 || 2.68 || 1.13 ||2.13  ||8.35 
|-
| align="left" | 2008-09
| align="left" | Kwidzyn
|13 ||  || 19.0 ||.567  || .333 ||.679  || 5.8 || 1.3 || 1.0 ||1.2  ||7.7 
|-
| align="left" | 2009-10
| align="left" | Holon
|6 ||  || 22.5 ||.438  || .250 ||.500  || 7.5 || 1.0 || 1.7 ||1.7  ||5.8 
|-
| align="left" | 2009-10
| align="left" |Zgorzelec
|3 ||0 || 19.3 ||.600  || .600 ||.500  || 4.33 || 0.67 || 1.00 ||1.00  ||6.00 
|-
| align="left" | 2010-11
| align="left" | BAK
|39 ||22 || 26.1 ||.460  || .360 ||.586  || 6.79 || 2.18 || 0.92 ||1.49  ||9.87 
|-
| align="left" | 2011-12
| align="left" | Akita
|6 ||6 || 14.7 ||.441  || .000 ||.583  || 4.3 || 0.3 || 0.3 ||1.2  ||6.2 
|-
| align="left" | 2011-12
| align="left" | BAK
|6 ||3 || 19.9 ||.312  || .222 ||.333  || 3.83 || 1.33 || 0.67 ||0.67  ||4.00 
|-
| align="left" | 2011-12
| align="left" | Apollon/Toros
|6 ||2 || 21.9 ||.500  || .143 ||.900  || 6.50 || 0.67 || 1.33 ||1.33  ||9.67 
|-
| align="left" | 2012-13
| align="left" | FWN
|44||19 || 24.0 ||.440  || .362 ||.595  || 6.36 || 1.23 || 0.66 ||1.41  ||7.95 
|-

Playoffs 

|-
|style="text-align:left;"|2007-08
|style="text-align:left;"|SBL
| 2 || 2 || 36.9 || .440 || .333 || .500 || 13.50 || 1.50 || 0.50 || 3.00 || 12.00
|-
|style="text-align:left;"|2009-10
|style="text-align:left;"|Turow
| 6 ||  || 25.7 || .326 || .200 || .700 || 7.2 || 1.2 || 1.2 || 0.2|| 6.8
|-
|style="text-align:left;"|2010-11
|style="text-align:left;"|BAK
| 3 || 0  || 21.1 || .263 || .000 || .167 || 5.67 || 0.67 || 0.67 || 0.00 || 3.67
|-
|style="text-align:left;"|2012-13
|style="text-align:left;"|BAK
| 2 || 2  || 36.7 || .474 || .333 || .500 || 8.50 || 1.50 || 0.50 || 1.00 || 10.50
|-

References

External links

Profile at Eurobasket.com

1985 births
Living people
Akita Northern Happinets players
American expatriate basketball people in Israel
American expatriate basketball people in Japan
American expatriate basketball people in Poland
American expatriate basketball people in Turkey
American expatriate basketball people in Venezuela
American men's basketball players
Bakersfield Jam players
Basketball players from Georgia (U.S. state)
Fort Wayne Mad Ants players
Hapoel Holon players
Iowa Energy players
Los Angeles D-Fenders players
Mersin Büyükşehir Belediyesi S.K. players
People from Statesboro, Georgia
Power forwards (basketball)
Small forwards
South Carolina Gamecocks men's basketball players
Turów Zgorzelec players
Utah Flash players